Peter J. Smith (born November 6, 1940) is an American attorney who served as the United States Attorney for the Middle District of Pennsylvania from 2010 to 2016.

References

1940 births
Living people
United States Attorneys for the Middle District of Pennsylvania
Pennsylvania Democrats
Golden Gate University School of Law alumni
20th-century American lawyers
21st-century American lawyers